Japan - Mie Prefecture - Minamimuro District

 is a rural district located in Mie Prefecture, Japan. As of September 1, 2012, the district had an estimated population of 20,543 and a population density of 122 persons/km2. The total area was 167.94 km2.

At present, Minamimuru District contains 2 towns.

Timeline

 July 22, 1878 - Due to early Meiji period land reforms, Minamimuro Distrocy was formed when former Muro District, Kii Province was split into Minamimuro and Kitamuro Districts within Mie Prefecture and Higashimuro and Nishimuro Districts within Wakayama Prefecture.
 April 1, 1889 - With the establishment of municipalities, Minamimuro District was organized into one town and 18 villages: 
 Kinomoto Town (木本町), Arasaka Village (荒坂村), Atashika Village (新鹿村), Arii Village (有井村), Kamikawa Village (神川村), Isato Village (五郷村), Asuka Village (飛鳥村), Jōsen Village (上川村), Iruka Village (入鹿村), Nishiyama Village (西山村) - (Currently the City of Kumano (熊野市))
 Atawa Village (阿田和村), Kōshiyama Village (神志山村), Ichigi Village (市木村), Oroshi Village (尾呂志村) - (Currently the town of Mihama)
 Mifune Village (御船村), Onodani Village (相野谷村), Uwano Village (宇和野村)- (Currently the town of Kihō)
 Kitawauchi Village (北輪内村), Minamiwauchi Village (南輪内村) - (Currently the City of Owase)
 February 13, 1894 - The village of Uwano split into the villages of Udono (鵜殿村) and Ida (井田村). (1 town, 19 villages)
 May 31, 1897 - Parts of the town of Kimoto (the localities of Furutomari(古泊) and Ōdomari(大泊)) split to form the new village of Tomari (泊村). (1 town, 20 villages)
 October 1, 1933 -  Atawa was elevated to town status. (2 towns, 19 villages)
 June 20, 1954 - The villages of Kitawauchi and Minamiwauchi merged with the town of Owase (尾鷲町) and the villages of Kuki (九鬼村) and Sugari (須賀利村) from Kitamuro District, to launch the city of Owase. (2 towns, 17 villages)
 October 31, 1954 - The villages of Ida, Mifune, and　Onodani merged to form the town of Kihō. (3 towns, 14 villages)
 November 3, 1954 - The town of Kinomoto and the villages of Arasaka, Atashika, Arii, Kamikawa, Isato, Asuka, and Tomari merged to form the city of Kumano. (2 towns, 7 villages)
 March 1, 1955 - The villages of Jōsen, Iruka, and Nishiyama merged to form the town of Kiwa (紀和町). (3 towns, 4 villages)
 September 30, 1956 - The villages of Ichigi and Oroshi merged to form Ichigioroshi Village (市木尾呂志村). (3 towns, 3 villages)
 September 1, 1958 - The town of Atawa and the villages of Ichigioroshi and Kōshiyama merged to form the town of Mihama. (3 towns, 1 village)
 November 1, 2005 - The town of Kiwa merged with the city of Kumano to launch the city of Kumano. (2 towns, 1 village)
 January 10, 2006 - The town of Kihō and the village of Udono merged to launch the town of Kihō. (2 towns)

Minamimuro District